A reptile centre (or reptile center) is typically a facility devoted to keeping living reptiles, educating the public about reptiles, and serving as a control centre for collecting reptiles that turn up in populated areas. Most are public-access, run as private business or state-sponsored.  Some centres work with venomous reptiles as venom research labs. Others are simply privately run zoos devoted to solely to reptiles or are incorporated into larger zoos or organizations.

One example is the reptile centre in Alice Springs, Australia, devoted to indigenous reptiles. Many are collected from local homes, yards, or from areas about to be burned under the controlled burning program to keep summer grass fires from threatening the local homes. Most of the reptiles end up being relocated to uninhabited areas. The Alice Springs centre also doubles as a snake call centre, with the owner and staff coming out to homes to remove venomous snakes from inconvenient places.

In America, Black Hills Reptile Gardens is the nation's largest collection of reptiles. It is located at Rapid City, South Dakota in the heart of the Black Hills. It was founded in 1937.

Also in the United States, the St. Augustine Alligator Farm Zoological Park is the only complete collection of the world's crocodilians. In 1893 the St. Augustine Alligator Farm started as a small facility, displaying the American Alligator. It is accredited with the AZA (Association of Zoos and Aquariums).

A Burmese Python at the reptile centre Serpent Safari in Gurnee, Illinois was billed as the heaviest living snake in captivity. The snake was named Baby.

See also 
 Herpetarium

References

Zoos
Reptiles and humans